The 2017 World Series Formula V8 3.5 was a multi-event motor racing championship for open wheel, formula racing cars held across Europe.was second and final season of Formula V8 3.5 Series The championship features drivers competing in World Series Formula 3.5 V8 formula race cars that conform to the technical regulations for the championship. The 2017 became the first season as feeder series to FIA World Endurance Championship. The season also marked the return of the name "World Series" after one season, as the FIA accepted the request from promoter RPM Racing. The name "World Series" was retrieved from the championship after Renault Sport withdraw its support and the Formula Renault 3.5 became Formula V8 3.5 for the 2016 season. It was the final season of the series which was promoted by RPM-MKTG since 1998.

Teams and drivers

Driver changes
Changed teams
 Alfonso Celis, Jr. switched from AVF to Fortec Motorsports.
 Pietro Fittipaldi, who raced for Fortec Motorsports moved to Lotus.
 Matevos Isaakyan moved from SMP Racing to AVF. He was joined in AVF by Egor Orudzhev, who left Arden Motorsport.
 Yu Kanamaru, who raced for Teo Martín Motorsport moved to RP Motorsport.
Entering World Series Formula V8 3.5
 Euroformula Open Championship drivers Damiano Fioravanti and Diego Menchaca made their debut with Il Barone Rampante and Fortec Motorsports respectively.
 Nelson Mason returned to racing for the first time since 2014 as he joins the World Series with Teo Martín Motorsport.
 Konstantin Tereshchenko stepped up from GP3 Series to race with Teo Martín Motorsport.
Leaving World Series Formula V8 3.5
RP Motorsport driver Vitor Baptista returned to the Formula 3 Brasil championship.
Fortec Motorsports driver and 2016 runner-up Louis Delétraz left the series to join the FIA Formula 2 Championship.
2016 champion Tom Dillmann moved to Formula E.
Arden Motorsport driver Aurélien Panis will make his touring car racing debut in World Touring Car Championship.
SMP Racing driver Matthieu Vaxiviere switched to sports car racing, moving to FIA World Endurance Championship
Mid-season changes
Damiano Fioravanti restored his collaboration with RP Motorsport, leaving the Barone Rampante team after the first round due to funding issues. Fiorovanti's seat at RP Motorsport was taken by Tatiana Calderón, who will make her debut in the series in Bahrain.
Prior to the Nürburgring round, Nelson Mason was replaced (due to a lack of funding) by Spanish driver Álex Palou.
Prior to the Bahrain round, Egor Orudzhev was diagnosed with acute tonsillitis and was replaced by his fellow Russian Konstantin Tereshchenko.
Henrique Chaves joined AVF in their third car for the final round in Bahrain.

Team changes
 Arden Motorsport, Comtec Racing and SMP Racing have left the series. However, both Comtec and the proposed Durango entry were listed on the World Series website with "TBC" driver names, suggesting they may enter at a later date. The Durango Racing Team entry was later bought by Giuseppe Cipriani, who entered his own team, Il Barone Rampante.

Race calendar
The provisional calendar for the 2017 season was announced on 7 November 2016, at the final round of the 2016 season. The Nürburgring round will return to the World Series' schedule, while the Hungaroring, Le Castellet, Spielberg and Barcelona will be removed from the calendar. The championship will have rounds outside Europe for the first time since 2002, visiting  Autódromo Hermanos Rodríguez, Circuit of the Americas and Bahrain International Circuit.

Results

Championship standings
Points system
Points were awarded to the top 10 classified finishers.

Drivers' Championship

Teams' Championship
Only two best-finishing cars are allowed to score points in the championship.

References

External links

World Series Formula V8 3.5 seasons
World Series Formula V8 3.5
Formula V8 3.5